The Slovenian Women's Basketball Cup is the national women's basketball cup of Slovenia. It was first contested in the 1991–92 season.

Cup winners

Performance by club

See also
Slovenian Women's Basketball League

External links
Official website 

Women
Women's basketball cup competitions in Europe
Recurring sporting events established in 1991
1991 establishments in Slovenia
Cup